Manuel Franco Rocati (born 30 January 1998), known professionally as Rosa Chemical, is an Italian rapper, singer, graffiti artist and model.

Biography 
Rocati was born in Rivoli and grew up in Alpignano, in the metropolitan city of Turin. His pseudonym is a portmanteau of the terms "Rosa", his mother's first name, and "Chemical", from the American band My Chemical Romance. Before becoming interested in hip hop music, he was a graffiti artist, as visible in the programme YO! MTV Raps, around Europe.

After a few independent releases, under the pseudonyms Ekios or Kranyo, his music career began in 2018, when he released the single "Kournikova", becoming at the same time model for the Italian fashion label Gucci. In February 2019, he began a collaboration with Italian rapper Greg Willen, releasing the single "Rovesciata", which anticipates the release of the EP Okay Okay !!. From the EP the single "Tik Tok" was extracted, in collaboration with Radical, which reaches Spotify Italy's Viral 50.

In 2020, he released the singles "Alieno", in collaboration with UncleBac, and "Polka", which anticipated the release of the first studio album Forever, released on May 28, of the same year. On March 25, 2021, the album was reissued under the title Forever and Ever, containing five bonus tracks, which was preceded by the single "Britney", in collaboration with MamboLosco and Radical.

On 4 February 2022, he was a guest on the cover night of the Sanremo Musica Festival, where he performed alongside Tananai a rearrangement of the song "A far l'amore comincia tu" by Raffaella Carrà, entitled "Comincia tu". On 4 December of the same year, it was officially announced that Rosa Chemical will participate in the Sanremo Music Festival 2023. "Made in Italy" was later announced as her entry for the Sanremo Music Festival 2023.

Discography

Studio albums

Extended plays

Mixtape albums

Singles

As lead artist

References 

Living people
Italian LGBT musicians
1998 births
Italian rappers
Italian graffiti artists
Italian models
21st-century Italian male musicians